Tokischa Altagracia Peralta Juárez (born 17 March 1996) known mononymously as Tokischa, is a Dominican rapper and songwriter.

After working for the renowned photographer Raymi Paulus, she was offered to enter the music industry. She signed a recording contract with Paulus Music and released his debut single "Pícala" to great regional success. In 2021 she expanded horizons, and was introduced to global artist. After her song "Linda" alongside Rosalía was released with great commercial success, she continued collaborating with artists such as J Balvin, Madonna, Anuel AA and Ozuna. Her lyrics mostly refer to sexual activity. Tokischa has often been catalogued as "controversial" by media outlets, with her music sparking controversy and receiving notable media coverage.

Early life 
Tokischa was born in 1996 in a humble environment and spent most of her childhood and adolescence in the Los Frailes district, a low income area in the eastern region of the Santo Domingo Province. Her mother moved to the United States when she was very young. Despite this, she was always aware of her. Her father was in jail, from which he escaped several times.

Tokischa studied fine arts and dramaturgy. At sixteen she dedicated herself to professional modeling and at eighteen she started working in a call center for a year. At that age she dedicated herself to sex work, about which she commented during an interview: "being with a person you don't like and like is frustrating. After I had sex with someone, I would go into the bathroom to take a shower, crying, frustrated". At first she would spent the money on drugs, then on music. At age twenty, while Tokischa was doing a photoshoot for a magazine in her hometown, she met producer and designer Raymi Paulus, who was fascinated by her voice and musical talent, and asked her to record some songs in his studio. She eventually signed a record deal with his label Paulus Music.

Tokischa identifies as bisexual.

Music career

2018–present: First releases and regional success 
In 2018 Tokischa debuted with the song “Pícala”, with Dominican singer Tivi Gunz. The music video, which reached one million views in the opening week, has scenes that show a psychedelic and hallucinogenic trip caused by the consumption of some substances. In November, she released the song "Que Viva" with Químico Ultra Mega. It was also presented at the Dominican Trap Festival, which takes place annually in different locations around the country.

In February 2019, Tokischa released the single "Perras Como Tú", as part of the soundtrack for the Mexican film Miss Bala: Merciless. In September, she released the extended play Freestyle #007, featuring DJ Scuff. At the same time she released the single "Empatillada", with Jamby El Favo. The following month, she released the single "Twerk" with Eladio Carrión. Its music video reached more than five million views on the YouTube platform. The following year, Tokischa premiered the song "Varón", one of her most controversial songs. In February, she collaborated on the single "Amor & Dinero" by Jinchoo. In October, she released the song "Desacato Escolar" with Yomel El Meloso and Leo RD, which was partly censored on several platforms for a limited time. The following month, she released the single "Hoy Amanecí", featuring Tivi Gunz. In December, she published "El Rey de la Popola", with Dominican singer Rochy RD.

In January 2021, Tokischa published the single "Yo No Me Voy Acostar", alongside Yailin La Más Viral and La Perversa. That same month she premiered "Bellaca Putona", with Químico Ultra Mega, which managed to position itself at the top of the charts in her home country. During the year, she continued to release songs in the urbano umbrella genre and collaborations with regional artist. Tokischa made international headlines in the summer of that year after several collaborations with Latin artists J Balvin and Rosalía. Both music videos were filmed in Santo Domingo. Both Tokischa and Rosalía largely teased their song "Linda", which was produced by Leo RD. It was released on 1 September. They collaborated again the following year on "La Combi Versace", from the latter's album Motomami. A week before, "Perra", the Balvin collaboration, was released for digital download. Tokischa, together with her record label Paulus Music, had previously signed a distribution deal with Equity Distribution, Roc Nation's indie distribution company earlier that season.

In September 2022, Tokischa was featured on "Hung Up on Tokischa", a remix of Madonna's 2005 hit single "Hung Up"; the song uses dembow.

Artistry 
Tokischa cultivates various musical styles, where trap, hip hop, rap and urbano stand out. However, she has stated in different occasions that there is no genre that identifies her. Her songs have quite personal and "the most honest possible" lyrics. One artist who inspired her early in her career was DJ Scuff. Tokischa is also a fan of rock music. She has stated that: "I chose to trap because it is the closest thing there is now to rock, which has always been my favorite genre. Trap is modern rock. At that time I was very unleashed, and I expressed myself that way".

Controversies 
In December 2019, Tokischa signed up on OnlyFans and started to post sexually-explicit content after having previously been censored on Instagram. In 2021, the singer said that "I opened my account because I have always liked explicit content, sexuality, sexiness and morbid. That had always caused trouble to me as a child since my family saw me taking hot pictures. Instagram deleted a couple photos of me some years ago so, when OnlyFans became a thing, I saw the opportunity to do it with no censorship nor explanation. I also met a team of professionals who taught me how to make an economic profit out of it. That helped me quite a lot during the pandemic. All investment I did in my music in the last months has come from this platform".

In October 2020 she released the track "Desacato Escolar", a collaboration with Yomel El Meloso and Leo RD, on streaming platforms. The track caused controversy for its lyrics referencing prostitution. It was taken down from YouTube. Tokischa talked about it to RTVE, stating that: "I think that those people who criticize him do not want to accept life as it is. Dembow and urban music in general are the expression of the neighborhood and the underworld, of what is lived. If the rap tells you about crime and weapons, it is because that exists, not because the artist is inventing it. We cannot ignore those realities. Prostitution is the same, it has always existed, and if they talk about it in songs, it is because it is like that. If that person who criticizes feels very neat, then perhaps it is because he does not want to know about these realities or that all that comes to light, but we sing about what we live, and that is inevitable".

In August 2021, the rapper posed semi-naked at the sanctuary of the Virgin of Altagracia in La Vega. The town's mayor, released a statement in which he condemned that Tokischa "failed to the ethical norms and values that that govern the civilized and exemplary coexistence of our municipality". The rapper later expressed her regrets online and stated that "I didn't do it with the intention of offending, if not more to show that anyone can pray, come from wherever, or whatever it represents". Despite the apology, the La Vega Prosecutor's Office ruled that the performer will not be able to visit the sanctuaries of that province for a year, after Mayor Kelvin Cruz filed a complaint against her.

Discography

Selected singles

As lead artist

Guest appearances

Awards and nominations

References 

1996 births
20th-century LGBT people
21st-century Dominican Republic artists
21st-century LGBT people
Bisexual musicians
Dominican Republic women rappers
Latin music songwriters
Dominican Republic LGBT people
LGBT people in Latin music
Living people
Mixed-race Dominicans
OnlyFans creators
People from Puerto Plata, Dominican Republic
Urbano musicians
Women in Latin music
21st-century women rappers
21st-century rappers
Latin Grammy Award winners